Methanopyrales are an order of microbes within the class methanopyri.

It contains only one family, Methanopyraceae, one genus, Methanopyrus, and one species, Methanopyrus kandleri. This species is chemolithoautotrophic and its cells are bacillus in form. It grows comfortably at temperatures of 98 °C and can survive at temperatures as high as 110 °C, making it the most thermophilic known methanogen. Strain 116 can survive at up to 122 °C. They live in hydrothermal vents and were first discovered on the walls of a black smoker in the Gulf of California, at the depth of 2000 metres. They are similar to Methanobacteriales, but unlike other methanogenic archaea, their cell walls contain pseudomurein.

References

Further reading

Scientific articles

Scientific databases

External links

Archaea taxonomic orders
Euryarchaeota